Ballechin Wood is a large coniferous forest site, around  in area, located above Ballechin in Perth and Kinross, Scotland. The wood merges into Clunie Wood to the northwest and Logierait Wood to the southeast.

Ballechin House stands in the forest, accessed from the A827 Ballinluig-to-Grandtully road.

The wood is maintained by the Forestry Commission Scotland.

References 

Forest parks of Scotland
Protected areas of Perth and Kinross

Landforms of Perth and Kinross